The men's 400 metres event at the 1971 Pan American Games was held in Cali on 31 July and 1 August.

Medalists

Results

Heats
Held on 31 July

Semifinals
Held on 31 July

Final
Held on 1 August

References

Athletics at the 1971 Pan American Games
1971